Allendale (aka Allandale) is a town in Victoria, Australia, located north-east of Creswick, in the Shire of Hepburn.

The town began as a mining settlement around the Berry Leads mining area. It had a peak population of about 1,500. Allendale once had ten hotels, railway station, post office, bakery, and shops, all of which have closed.  The small boarding school located in Leishman Street was sold in 2005.
Allendale Post Office opened on 6 May 1881, was known as Allandale from 1885 to 1893, and closed in 1974.

Allendale Railway Station was on the North Creswick to Daylesford line. The railway closed in sections with Allendale to Newlyn closed on 1 December 1976, and from North Creswick to Allendale on 8 December 1986.

References

External links
 Photo of Allendale Railway Station, 1922
 History of Allendale

Towns in Victoria (Australia)
Mining towns in Victoria (Australia)